Jim "Long Gone" Thomas (December 18, 1938 – October 4, 2015) was an American gridiron football player and coach.  He played professionally as a running back for nine seasons in the Canadian Football League CFL) with the Edmonton Eskimos. Thomas ran for 6,161 yards in his CFL career and was a two-time CFL All-Star.  He signed to the Los Angeles Rams of the National Football League (NFL) in 1970 for a five-game trial, but returned to Edmonton.

Thomas holds the record for the three longest rushing touchdowns in Eskimos history—a 104-yard run on October 9, 1965 against the BC Lions, a 100-yard run on August 2, 1966 against the Winnipeg Blue Bombers, and a 97-yard run on September 4, 1964 against the Ottawa Rough Riders.

Thomas attended R. E. Hunt High School in Columbus, Mississippi, a segregated school for blacks only. He attended college at Mississippi Industrial College in Holly Springs, Mississippi.

After his playing career was over, Thomas earned a master's degree from Southwestern Oklahoma State University. He coached in college at Southwestern Oklahoma State and the University of Mississippi (Ole Miss) as well as Noxubee County High School, Houston High School, and in Memphis before winding up at Mississippi Valley State University.

Thomas died in 2015.

Head coaching record

References 

1938 births
2015 deaths
Canadian football running backs
Edmonton Elks players
Mississippi Industrial Tigers football players
Mississippi Valley State Delta Devils football coaches
Ole Miss Rebels football coaches
Southwestern Oklahoma State Bulldogs football coaches
Rust College alumni
Southwestern Oklahoma State University alumni
People from Columbus, Mississippi
Players of American football from Mississippi
African-American coaches of American football
African-American players of American football
African-American players of Canadian football
20th-century African-American sportspeople
21st-century African-American sportspeople